The England women's national field hockey team are the current Commonwealth Games champions having previously won silver 3 times. England have also won the 2006 Women's Field Hockey World Cup Qualifier and the 2002 Champions Challenge.

History
Marjorie Pollard played hockey nearly every year for England from 1921 to 1937.

The team toured New Zealand in 1938 and the US in 1947. Notable players were Barbara and Bridget West, Hilda Light and Mary Russell Vick. The teams had to play in long stockings whatever the heat until they were replaced with split skirts and knee high stockings.

Competitive record

World Cup
 1983 – 5th place
 1986 – 5th place
 1990 – 4th place
 1994 – 9th place
 1998 – 9th place
 2002 – 5th place
 2006 – 7th place
 2010 – 
 2014 – 11th place
 2018 – 7th place
 2022 – 8th place

Commonwealth Games
 1998 – 
 2002 – 
 2006 – 
 2010 – 
 2014 – 
 2018 – 
 2022 –

World League
 2012–13 – 
 2014–15 – 7th place
 2016–17 – 4th place

Pro League
 2021–22 – 7th place

EuroHockey Nations Championship
 1984 – 4th place
 1987 – 
 1991 – 
 1995 – 4th place
 1999 – 
 2003 – 4th place
 2005 – 
 2007 – 
 2009 – 
 2011 – 
 2013 – 
 2015 – 
 2017 – 
 2019 – 4th place
 2021 – 5th place

Champions Challenge
 2002 – 
 2005 – 4th place
 2007 –

Champions Trophy
 2002 – 6th place
 2003 – 5th place
 2009 – 6th place
 2010 – 
 2011 – 5th place
 2014 – 5th place

Current squad
The squad for the 2022 Women's FIH Hockey World Cup.

Head coach: David Ralph

The following players have also been selected for the squad for the 2021-22 Women's FIH Pro League.

Results and fixtures

FIH Pro League

FIH World Cup

XXI Commonwealth Games

EuroHockey Championship Qualifiers

See also
England men's national field hockey team
Great Britain men's national field hockey team
Great Britain women's national field hockey team

References

External links

FIH profile

National team
European women's national field hockey teams
Field hockey